The Anchor is a pub in the London Borough of Southwark. It is in the Bankside locality on the south bank of the River Thames, close to Southwark Cathedral and London Bridge station. A tavern establishment (under various names) has been at the pub's location for over 800 years. Behind the pub are buildings that were operated by the Anchor Brewery.

The Anchor started life as the "brewery tap room" for the Anchor Brewery, first established in 1616. Michelin's travel guide incorrectly states that the Anchor was rebuilt in 1676 after the Great Fire of London in 1666 destroyed it.  This was impossible as the fire never reached the southern side of the Thames outside of the limits of the City of London. The book The Rough Guide to London states that the establishment was first built in 1770. The establishment was also rebuilt again in the 19th century.

The establishment has been described as "Bankside's oldest surviving tavern" in the book Secret Bankside: Walks in the Outlaw Borough.

History

This pub is the sole survivor of the riverside inns that existed here in Shakespeare's time when this district was at the heart of theatreland and the Thames was London's principal highway. It was frequented by many actors from the neighbouring playhouses, including the Globe, the Swan and the Rose. It is where diarist Samuel Pepys observed the Great Fire of London in 1666. He wrote that he took refuge in "a little alehouse on bankside ... and there watched the fire grow". Another fire devastated the pub, whose interior was mainly constructed of oak. It was rebuilt in 1676 and has since had additions over the centuries. The Anchor tavern became a favourite place for river pirates and smugglers; during the course of repairs carried out in the early 19th century the removal of a massive oak beam revealed ingeniously contrived hiding places, which were probably used for the storage of stolen goods and contraband.

In contemporary times
In June 2008, the Anchor underwent one of the most costly refurbishments in pub history – reported to have cost £2.6 million – funded by its then owners Punch Taverns. The pub is now owned by Greene King and is branded as London Locals Urban Business.

Notable clientele
Notable patrons of the Anchor have included:
 David Garrick
 Oliver Goldsmith
 Samuel Johnson

In popular culture
 The Anchor was featured in the closing scenes of Mission: Impossible.

References

Notes

Further reading
 Roberts, Sir Howard and Godfrey, Walter H. (editors), (1950).   Survey of London: volume 22: Bankside (the parishes of St. Saviour and Christchurch Southwark). Chapter 9: The Anchor Brewery. Pages 78–80. 
 
 Burke, Thomas (1932). An Old London Alehouse: the Anchor, at Bankside. London.

External links
 

Buildings and structures on the River Thames
Tourist attractions in the London Borough of Southwark
Pubs in the London Borough of Southwark
Grade II listed buildings in the London Borough of Southwark
Grade II listed pubs in London